"Lion Fanfare and Downfield" is a fight song medley of the Pennsylvania State University.  It is performed at the beginning of every football game in which the Penn State Blue Band is present.

The "Lion Fanfare" is performed with a fanfare step which follows the traditional Blue Band high step, but the changing between feet is extra crisp, and performed at half-time.  The piece consists of a high intensity fanfare performed with a 45 degree snap to the left, 90 degree snap to the right, and another 45 degree snap to the left which brings the band back facing the direction it started in.  The fanfare segues directly into "Downfield", which moves the entire block band to midfield to the tune of "The Nittany Lion".

External links
 Mp3 of "Lion Fanfare and Downfield" at the Penn State Blue Band website

American college songs
College fight songs in the United States
Penn State Nittany Lions fight songs
Year of song missing